Like You may refer to:

"Like You" (Bow Wow song), 2005
"Like You" (Daddy Yankee song), 2005
"Like You" (Kelis song), 2006
"Like You" (Evanescence song), 2006
"Like You (And Everyone Else)", 2010 song by Beth Hart from her 2010 album My California